Pasupathikoil is a village in the Papanasam taluk of Thanjavur district, Tamil Nadu, India. This village has an early chola temple of Brahmapurisvarar called Tirupullamangai.

Demographics 
As per the 2001 census, Pasupathikoil had a total population of 7431 with 3540 males and 3891 females. The sex ratio was 1099. The literacy rate was 75.29.

Gallery

References 

 

Villages in Thanjavur district